Kani Shurik (also Romanized as Kānī Shūrīk; also known as Kānī Shūrak) is a village in Anzal-e Jonubi Rural District, Anzal District, Urmia County, West Azerbaijan Province, Iran. At the 2006 census, its population was 89, in 16 families.

References 

Populated places in Urmia County